Graphium olbrechtsi is a butterfly in the family Papilionidae (swallowtails). It is found in the Democratic Republic of the Congo.

Subspecies
Graphium olbrechtsi olbrechtsi (Democratic Republic of the Congo: Kabinda, Lomami, Lualaba)
Graphium olbrechtsi tongoni Berger, 1969 (Democratic Republic of the Congo: east to Maniema)

Taxonomy
Graphium olbrechtsi belongs to a species group with 16 members. All are very similar
The species group members are:
Graphium abri Smith & Vane-Wright, 2001 
Graphium adamastor  (Boisduval, 1836) 
Graphium agamedes (Westwood, 1842)
Graphium almansor (Honrath, 1884)
Graphium auriger (Butler, 1876) 
Graphium aurivilliusi (Seeldrayers, 1896)
Graphium fulleri  (Grose-Smith, 1883)
Graphium hachei (Dewitz, 1881)
Graphium kigoma Carcasson, 1964
Graphium olbrechtsi Berger, 1950
Graphium poggianus (Honrath, 1884)
Graphium rileyi Berger, 1950
Graphium schubotzi (Schultze, 1913)
Graphium simoni (Aurivillius, 1899),
Graphium ucalegon  (Hewitson, 1865)[
Graphium ucalegonides (Staudinger, 1884)

References

External links
External images

olbrechtsi
Butterflies of Africa
Endemic fauna of the Democratic Republic of the Congo
Lepidoptera of the Democratic Republic of the Congo
Butterflies described in 1950